A slave market is a place where slaves are bought and sold. These markets became a key phenomenon in the history of slavery.

Slave markets in the Ottoman Empire 

In the Ottoman Empire during the mid-14th century, slaves were traded in special marketplaces called "Esir" or "Yesir" that were located in most towns and cities. It is said that Sultan Mehmed II "the Conqueror" established the first Ottoman slave market in Constantinople in the 1460s, probably where the former Byzantine slave market had stood. According to Nicolas de Nicolay, there were slaves of all ages and both sexes, they were displayed naked to be thoroughly checked by possible buyers.

In the early 18th century, the Crimean Khanate maintained a massive slave trade with the Ottoman Empire and the Middle East, exporting about 2 million slaves from Russia and Poland-Lithuania over the period 1500–1700. Caffa (modern Feodosia) became one of the best-known and significant trading ports and slave markets.

Slave markets in the East African slave trade

In Somalia, the inhabiting Bantus are descended from Bantu groups that had settled in Southeast Africa after the initial expansion from Nigeria/Cameroon, and whose members were later captured and sold into the Arab slave trade.
From 1800 to 1890, between 25,000–50,000 Bantu slaves are thought to have been sold from the slave market of Zanzibar to the Somali coast. Most of the slaves were from the Majindo, Makua, Nyasa, Yao, Zalama, Zaramo and Zigua ethnic groups of Tanzania, Mozambique and Malawi. Collectively, these Bantu groups are known as Mushunguli, which is a term taken from Mzigula, the Zigua tribe's word for "people" (the word holds multiple implied meanings including "worker", "foreigner", and "slave"). Bantu adult and children slaves (referred to collectively as jareer by their Somali masters) were purchased in the slave market exclusively to do undesirable work on plantation grounds.

Enslaved Africans were sold in the towns of the Arab world. In 1416, al-Maqrizi told how pilgrims coming from Takrur (near the Senegal River) had brought 1,700 slaves with them to Mecca. In North Africa, the main slave markets were in Morocco, Algiers, Tripoli and Cairo. Sales were held in public places or in souks.

Potential buyers made a careful examination of the "merchandise": they checked the state of health of a person who was often standing naked with wrists bound together. In Cairo, transactions involving eunuchs and concubines happened in private houses. Prices varied according to the slave's quality. Thomas Smee, the commander of the British research ship Ternate, visited such a market in Zanzibar in 1811 and gave a detailed description:

Slave markets in Europe

Among many other European slave markets, Genoa, and Venice were some well-known markets, their importance and demand growing after the great plague of the 14th century which decimated much of the European work force.
The maritime town of Lagos, Portugal, was the first slave market created in Portugal for the sale of imported African slaves, the Mercado de Escravos, which opened in 1444. In 1441, the first slaves were brought to Portugal from northern Mauritania. Prince Henry the Navigator, major sponsor of the Portuguese African expeditions, as of any other merchandise, taxed one fifth of the selling price of the slaves imported to Portugal. By 1552, African slaves made up 10% of the population of Lisbon. In the second half of the 16th century, the Crown gave up the monopoly on slave trade and the focus of European trade in African slaves shifted from import to Europe to slave transports directly to tropical colonies in the Americas—in the case of Portugal, especially Brazil. In the 15th century, one third of the slaves were resold to the African market in exchange of gold.

Slave markets in Africa

The slave trade had existed in North Africa since antiquity, with a supply of African slaves arriving through trans-Saharan trade routes. The towns on the North African coast were recorded in Roman times for their slave markets, and this trend continued into the medieval age. The Barbary slave trade on the Barbary Coast increased in influence in the 15th century, when the Ottoman Empire took over as rulers of the area. Coupled with this was an influx of Sephardi Jews and Moorish refugees, newly expelled from Spain after the Reconquista. The Barbary slave trade encompassed both African slavery and White slavery.

The Velekete Slave Market established in 1502 in Badagry, Lagos State, was significant during the Atlantic slave trade in Badagry as it served as a business point where African middlemen sold slaves to European slave merchants thus making it one of the most populous slave markets in West Africa.

Another historic slave market was Bono Manso Slave market around 16th century, which was centered at a giant Baobab tree to the west of the town played a major role in the Atlantic slave trade. This was one of the oldest slave transitions points in the Gold Coast.

Slave markets in North America

In the history of slavery in the United States, the domestic slave trade had become a major economic activity by 1815, and lasted until the 1860s. Between 1830 and 1840, nearly 250,000 slaves were taken across state lines. In the 1850s, more than 193,000 were transported, and historians estimate nearly one million in total took part in the forced migration of this new Middle Passage. By 1860, the slave population in the United States had reached 4 million.

In the 1840s, almost 300,000 slaves were transported, with Alabama and Mississippi receiving 100,000 each. During each decade between 1810 and 1860, at least 100,000 slaves were moved from their state of origin. In the final decade before the Civil War, 250,000 were moved. Historian Ira Berlin wrote:

The internal slave trade became the largest enterprise in the South outside the plantation itself, and probably the most advanced in its employment of modern transportation, finance, and publicity. The slave trade industry developed its own unique language, with terms such as "prime hands, bucks, breeding wenches, and "fancy girls" coming into common use.
The expansion of the interstate slave trade contributed to the "economic revival of once depressed seaboard states" as demand accelerated the value of slaves who were subject to sale.

Some traders moved their "chattels" by sea, with Norfolk to New Orleans being the most common route, but most slaves were forced to walk overland in coffles. Others were shipped downriver from such markets as Louisville on the Ohio River, and Natchez on the Mississippi. Traders created regular migration routes served by a network of slave pens, yards, and warehouses needed as temporary housing for the slaves. In addition, other vendors provided clothes, food, and supplies for slaves. As the trek advanced, some slaves were sold and new ones purchased. Berlin concluded, "In all, the slave trade, with its hubs and regional centers, its spurs and circuits, reached into every cranny of southern society. Few southerners, black or white, were untouched".

New Orleans, where French colonists had established sugarcane plantations and exported sugar as the chief commodity crop, became nationally important as a slave market and port, as slaves were shipped from there upriver by steamboat to plantations on the Mississippi River; it also sold slaves who had been shipped downriver from markets such as Louisville. By 1840, it had the largest slave market in North America. It became the wealthiest and the fourth-largest city in the nation, based chiefly on the slave trade and associated businesses. The trading season was from September to May, after the harvest.

One of the most famous remaining slave market buildings in the United States is the Old Slave Mart in Charleston, South Carolina. Throughout the first half of the 19th century, slaves brought into Charleston were sold at public auctions held on the north side of the Exchange and Provost building.  After the city prohibited public slave auctions in 1856, enclosed slave markets sprang up along Chalmers, State, and Queen streets. One such market was Ryan's Mart, established by City Councilman and broker, Thomas Ryan and his business partner, James Marsh.  Ryan's Mart originally consisted of a closed lot with three structures— a four-story barracoon or slave jail, a kitchen, and a morgue or "dead house".

In 1859, an auction master named Z. B. Oakes purchased Ryan's Mart, and built what is now the Old Slave Mart building for use as an auction gallery. In addition to slaves, the market sold real estate and stock. Slave auctions at Ryan's Mart were advertised in broadsheets throughout the 1850s, some appearing as far away as Galveston, Texas.

See also

 Barracoon
 House of Slaves
 Scramble (slave auction)
 Seasoning (slavery)
 Old Slave Mart

References

Market
Market (economics)
Human commodity auctions